No One's First, and You're Next is an EP by American indie rock band Modest Mouse, released on August 4, 2009. It features unreleased tracks and B-sides from the band's previous two studio albums, Good News for People Who Love Bad News (2004) and We Were Dead Before the Ship Even Sank (2007). The collection of repolished outtakes was first mentioned in February 2008 when Rolling Stone conducted a short interview with frontman Isaac Brock in their "Smoking Section" column; however, no other news regarding its release surfaced until an entire year later.

The vinyl version was released on August 14, 2009.

Promotion

Singles
Three sets of 7" vinyl singles preceded the EP's release. The first single, "Satellite Skin / Guilty Cocker Spaniels",  was planned to be released on April 18 in celebration of Record Store Day, but was pushed back to May 26 because Isaac Brock didn't like the color of the vinyl, as it wasn't the right shade of orange. The record seemed to have difficulty playing on many people's record players and the seller would not take them back, causing annoyance among Modest Mouse fans.

Music videos
Kevin Willis, who previously contributed artwork to drummer Jeremiah Green's side project Vells, directed the video for "Satellite Skin".  Before his death in January 2008, Heath Ledger had started working on a music video for "King Rat". Unfinished when he died, the video was completed by co-director Daniel Auber and others. It was released on August 4, 2009, the same day that the EP was released. Later that year, Bent Image Lab director Nando Costa created a video for "The Whale Song", utilizing stop-motion animation.

Track listing

Charts

References

External links
 

Modest Mouse albums
B-side compilation albums
2009 compilation albums